Maskinen ("The Machine") was a Swedish music group consisting of the rapper Herbert Munkhammar who was earlier part of the duo Afasi & Filthy and Frej Larsson, also a member of the band Slagsmålsklubben and duo Far & Son. Oskar "Kihlen" Linnros, formerly a member of the band Snook, was a member of Maskinen but left after the release of the single "Segertåget".

Maskinen's music style is alternative electro/hip hop with influences from baile funk. The band has released three albums, Boys II Men) and Stora Fötter Stora Skor ("Big Feet Big Shoes").

Members
Current members
 Frej Larsson (from band Slagsmålsklubben)
 Herbert "Afasi" Munkhammar (from duo Afasi & Filthy)
 Mats Norman (from duo Lilla Sällskapet)
Former members
 Oskar "Kihlen" Linnros (from band Snook)
 Magnus "Filthy" Lidehäll (from duo Afasi & Filthy)

Discography

Albums

Singles

References

External links
Official website
Official MySpace

Swedish hip hop groups
Swedish-language singers
Musical groups established in 2007